Rhoophilus is a genus of gall wasp including one species and endemic to South Africa.

Species 

 Rhoophilus loewi

References 

Cynipidae
Monotypic Hymenoptera genera